Jẹ́gẹ́dẹ́ is a given Yoruba male name or family name which means ‘of slender stem and inconsiderable height’. Notable people with the name include:

 Yinka Jegede-Ekpe
 JJ Jegede
 Yvonne Jegede
 Dele Jegede
 Tosin Jegede
 Eyitayo Jegede
 Tunde Jegede
 Emmanuel Taiwo Jegede
 Joy Jegede